Røra is a former municipality in the old Nord-Trøndelag county, Norway. The  municipality existed from 1907 until its dissolution in 1962. It was located at the northeastern end of the Trondheimsfjorden, just north of the towns of Verdalsøra and Levanger. It is located in what is now the southeastern part of Inderøy municipality in Trøndelag county. The administrative centre of the municipality was the village of Røra where Salberg Church is located.

History

The municipality of Røra was established on 1 January 1907 when the old municipality of Inderøy was divided into three municipalities: Røra (population: 866) in the southeast, Hustad (population: 732) in the north, and Inderøy (population: 2,976) in the west.

During the 1960s, there were many municipal mergers across Norway due to the work of the Schei Committee. On 1 January 1962, the three neighboring municipalities of Røra (population: 1,003), Sandvollan (population: 750), and Inderøy (population: 3,194) to form a new, larger municipality of Inderøy.

Name
The municipal name is Røra which is an old name for the area. The name likely comes from the genitive case of the word  which means "groin", probably referring to the shape of the bay near Røra.

Geography
Røra lies between Stiklestad and Mære, and is in an area of rich historical monuments. An early highway, The King's Road, was at a higher elevation than the current highway. Along this route there are several minor finds from earlier habitation. On the boundary between Nedre Vådal and Røflo remains have been found from a very old habitation, probably from the Iron Age. Defense works indicate that the habitation must have been over a long period and been substantial. The location was on a small peninsula between the Trondheimsfjorden and Børgin.

The entire landscape has been changed after a major landslide in the 14th century. Most of the disturbed mass slid into Hylla fjord, but some was diverted to Borgen fjord. The source of the slide is thought to be in the area near the Øvre Vådal farms near the border with Steinkjer. Much of the agricultural area lies in the disturbed area.

The coastal settlement at Hylla, which had steamship connections, was the original centre of the area, but when the railway arrived in 1905 a new centre grew up around the station that took over most of the functions.

Economy
Traditionally, agriculture was the most important industry in the area, but Røra has two important industrial of major importance. The limestone quarry at Hylla has been an important place of employment in the municipality. In addition Røra Fabrikker, owned by the Coop NKL, the Norwegian retailers' co-operative association produces an assortment of jams, juices, and other processed agricultural products are made in the factory. The company currently employs about 59 people.

Government
While it existed, this municipality was responsible for primary education (through 10th grade), outpatient health services, senior citizen services, unemployment, social services, zoning, economic development, and municipal roads. During its existence, this municipality was governed by a municipal council of elected representatives, which in turn elected a mayor.

Municipal council
The municipal council  of Røra was made up of 13 representatives that were elected to four year terms. The party breakdown of the final municipal council was as follows:

Mayors
The mayors of Røra:

 1907–1916: Sivert Austad (V)
 1917–1934: Johan Koa (V)
 1935–1941: Anders Austad (Bp)
 1941–1942: Marius Lunnan (V)
 1942–1944: Knut Forseth (NS)
 1944–1945: Ivar Ertzgaard (NS)
 1945-1945: Arthur Løe
 1945–1947: Anders Austad (Bp)
 1948–1955: John Følstad (Ap)
 1956–1959: Kåre Sjøvold (Ap)
 1960–1961: Jens Austad (Sp)

See also
List of former municipalities of Norway

References

Inderøy
Former municipalities of Norway
1907 establishments in Norway
1962 disestablishments in Norway